Jeep is an American automobile marque, now owned by multi-national corporation Stellantis. Jeep has been part of Chrysler since 1987, when Chrysler acquired the Jeep brand, along with remaining assets, from its previous owner American Motors Corporation (AMC).

Jeep's current product range consists solely of sport utility vehicles—both crossovers and fully off-road worthy SUVs and models, including one pickup truck. Previously, Jeep's range included other pick-ups, as well as small vans, and a few roadsters. Some of Jeep's vehicles—such as the Grand Cherokee—reach into the luxury SUV segment, a market segment the 1963 Wagoneer is considered to have started. Jeep sold 1.4 million SUVs globally in 2016, up from 500,000 in 2008, two-thirds of which in North America, and was Fiat-Chrysler's best selling brand in the U.S. during the first half of 2017. In the U.S. alone, over 2400 dealerships hold franchise rights to sell Jeep-branded vehicles, and if Jeep were spun off into a separate company, it is estimated to be worth between $22 and $33.5 billion—slightly more than all of FCA (US). Christian Meunier is the current President of the Jeep brand worldwide.

Prior to 1940 the term "jeep" had been used as U.S. Army slang for new recruits or vehicles, but the World War II "jeep" that went into production in 1941 specifically tied the name to this light military 4x4, arguably making them the oldest four-wheel drive mass-production vehicles now known as SUVs. The Jeep became the primary light 4-wheel-drive vehicle of the United States Armed Forces and the Allies during World War II, as well as the postwar period. The term became common worldwide in the wake of the war. Doug Stewart noted: "The spartan, cramped, and unstintingly functional jeep became the ubiquitous World War II four-wheeled personification of Yankee ingenuity and cocky, can-do determination." It is the precursor of subsequent generations of military light utility vehicles such as the Humvee, and inspired the creation of civilian analogs such as the original Series I Land Rover. Many Jeep variants serving similar military and civilian roles have since been designed in other nations.

The Jeep marque has been headquartered in Toledo, Ohio, ever since Willys–Overland launched production of the first CJ or Civilian Jeep branded models there in 1945. Its replacement, the conceptually consistent Jeep Wrangler series, has remained in production since 1986. With its solid axles and open top, the Wrangler has been called the Jeep model that is as central to the brand's identity as the 911 is to Porsche.

At least two Jeep models (the CJ-5 and the SJ Wagoneer) enjoyed extraordinary three-decade production runs of a single body generation.

In lowercase, the term "jeep" continues to be used as a generic term for vehicles inspired by the Jeep that are suitable for use on rough terrain.
In Iceland, the word Jeppi (derived from Jeep) has been used since WWII and is still used for any type of SUV.

World War II Jeeps

Development – 1. Bantam Reconnaissance Car

When it became clear that the United States would be involved in the European theater of World War II, the Army contacted 135 companies to create working prototypes of a four-wheel drive reconnaissance car. Only two companies responded: American Bantam Car Company and Willys-Overland. The Army set a seemingly impossible deadline of 49 days to supply a working prototype. Willys asked for more time, but was refused. American Bantam had only a small staff with nobody to draft the vehicle plans, so chief engineer Harold Crist hired Karl Probst, a talented freelance designer from Detroit. After turning down Bantam's initial request, Probst responded to an Army request and began work on July 17, 1940, initially without salary.

Probst drafted the full plans in just two days for the Bantam prototype known as the BRC or Bantam Reconnaissance Car, working up a cost estimate the next day. Bantam's bid was submitted on July 22, complete with blueprints. Much of the vehicle could be assembled from off-the-shelf automotive parts, and custom four-wheel drivetrain components were to be supplied by Spicer. The hand-built prototype was completed in Butler, Pennsylvania and driven to Camp Holabird, Maryland on September 23 for Army testing. The vehicle met all the Army's criteria except engine torque.

Development – 2. Willys and Ford

The Army thought that the Bantam company lacked the production capacity to manufacture and deliver the required number of vehicles, so it supplied the Bantam design to Willys and Ford, and encouraged them to enhance the design. The resulting Ford "Pygmy" and Willys "Quad" prototypes looked very similar to the Bantam BRC prototype, and Spicer supplied very similar four-wheel drivetrain components to all three manufacturers.

1,500 of each model (Bantam BRC-40, Ford GP, and Willys MA) were built and extensively field-tested. The Willys version became the standard jeep design, designated the model MB, and was built at their plant in Toledo, Ohio. The familiar pressed-metal Jeep grille was a Ford design feature and incorporated in the final design by the Army.

Because the US War Department required a large number of vehicles in a short time, Willys-Overland granted the US Government a non-exclusive license to allow another company to manufacture vehicles using Willys' specifications. The Army chose Ford as a second supplier, building Jeeps to the Willys' design. Willys supplied Ford with a complete set of plans and specifications. American Bantam, the creators of the first Jeep, built approximately 2,700 of them to the BRC-40 design, but spent the rest of the war building heavy-duty trailers for the Army.

Full production – Willys MB and Ford GPW

Final production version jeeps built by Willys-Overland were the Model MB, while those built by Ford were the Model GPW (G = government vehicle, P = 80" wheelbase, W = Willys engine design). There were subtle differences between the two. The versions produced by Ford had every component (including bolt heads) marked with an "F", and early on Ford also stamped their name in large letters in their trademark script, embossed in the rear panel of their jeeps. Willys followed the Ford pattern by stamping 'Willys' into several body parts, but the U.S. government objected to this practice, and both parties stopped this in 1942. In spite of persistent advertising by both car and component manufacturers of contributions to the production of successful jeeps during the war, no "Jeep"-branded vehicles were built until the 1945 Willys CJ-2A.

The cost per vehicle trended upwards as the war continued from the price under the first contract from Willys at US$648.74 (Ford's was $782.59 per unit). Willys-Overland and Ford, under the direction of Charles E. Sorensen (vice-president of Ford during World War II), produced about 640,000 Jeeps towards the war effort, which accounted for approximately 18% of all the wheeled military vehicles built in the U.S. during the war.

Jeeps were used by every service of the U.S. military. An average of 145 were supplied to every Army infantry regiment. Jeeps were used for many purposes, including cable laying, sawmilling, as firefighting pumpers, field ambulances, tractors, and, with suitable wheels, would run on railway tracks. An amphibious jeep, the model GPA, or "seep" (Sea Jeep) was built for Ford in modest numbers, but it could not be considered a success as it was neither a good off-road vehicle nor a good boat. As part of the war effort, nearly 30% of all Jeep production was supplied to Great Britain and to the Soviet Red Army.

Post-war military Jeeps
The Jeep has been widely imitated around the world, including in France by Delahaye and by Hotchkiss et Cie (after 1954, Hotchkiss manufactured Jeeps under license from Willys), and in Japan by Mitsubishi Motors and Toyota. The Land Rover was inspired by the Jeep. The utilitarian good looks of the original Jeep have been hailed by industrial designers and museum curators alike. The Museum of Modern Art described the Jeep as a masterpiece of functionalist design and has periodically exhibited the Jeep as part of its collection. Pulitzer Prize-winning war correspondent Ernie Pyle called the jeep, along with the Coleman G.I. Pocket Stove, "the two most important pieces of noncombat equipment ever developed." Jeeps became even more famous following the war, as they became available on the surplus market. Some ads claimed to offer "Jeeps still in the factory crate." This legend persisted for decades, despite the fact that Jeeps were never shipped from the factory in crates (although Ford did "knock down" Jeeps for easier shipping, which may have perpetuated the myth).

The Jeepney is a unique type of taxi or bus created in the Philippines. The first Jeepneys were military-surplus MBs and GPWs, left behind in the war-ravaged country following World War II and Filipino independence. Jeepneys were built from Jeeps by lengthening and widening the rear "tub" of the vehicle, allowing them to carry more passengers. Over the years, Jeepneys have become the most ubiquitous symbol of the modern Philippines, even as they have been decorated in more elaborate and flamboyant styles by their owners. Most Jeepneys today are scratch-built by local manufacturers, using different powertrains.

Aside from Jeepneys, backyard assemblers in the Philippines construct replica Jeeps with stainless steel bodies and surplus parts, and are called "owner-type jeeps" (as jeepneys are also called "passenger-type jeeps").

In the United States military, the Jeep has been supplanted by a number of vehicles (e.g. Ford's M151) of which the latest is the Humvee.

CJ-V35/U
After World War II, Jeep began to experiment with new designs, including a model that could drive underwater. On February 1, 1950, contract N8ss-2660 was approved for 1,000 units "especially adapted for general reconnaissance or command communications" and "constructed for short period underwater operation such as encountered in landing and fording operations." The engine was modified with a snorkel system so that the engine could properly breathe underwater.

M715

In 1965, Jeep developed the M715  army truck, a militarized version of the civilian J-series Jeep truck, which served extensively in the Vietnam War. It had heavier full-floating axles and a foldable, vertical, flat windshield. Today, it serves other countries and is still being produced by Kia under license.

Jeep etymology

Many explanations of the origin of the word jeep have proven difficult to verify. The most widely held theory is that the military designation GP (for Government Purposes or General Purpose) was slurred into the word Jeep in the same way that the contemporary HMMWV (for High-Mobility Multi-purpose Wheeled Vehicle) has become known as the Humvee. Joe Frazer, Willys-Overland President from 1939 to 1944, claimed to have coined the word jeep by slurring the initials G.P. There are no contemporaneous uses of "GP" before later attempts to create a "backronym."

A more detailed view, popularized by R. Lee Ermey on his television series Mail Call, disputes this "slurred GP" origin, saying that the vehicle was designed for specific duties, and was never referred to as "General Purpose" and it is highly unlikely that the average jeep-driving GI would have been familiar with this designation. The Ford GPW abbreviation actually meant G for government use, P to designate its  wheelbase and W to indicate its Willys-Overland designed engine. Ermey suggests that soldiers at the time were so impressed with the new vehicles that they informally named it after Eugene the Jeep, a character in the Thimble Theatre comic strip and cartoons created by E. C. Segar, as early as mid-March 1936. Eugene the Jeep was Popeye's "jungle pet" and was "small, able to move between dimensions and could solve seemingly impossible problems."

The word "jeep" however, was used as early as World War I, as U.S. Army slang for new uninitiated recruits, or by mechanics to refer to new unproven vehicles. In 1937, tractors which were supplied by Minneapolis Moline to the US Army were called jeeps. A precursor of the Boeing B-17 Flying Fortress was also referred to as the jeep.

Words of the Fighting Forces by Clinton A. Sanders, a dictionary of military slang, published in 1942, in the library at The Pentagon gives this definition:

Jeep: A four-wheel drive vehicle of one-half- [] to one-and-one-half-ton [] capacity for reconnaissance or other army duty. A term applied to the bantam-cars, and occasionally to other motor vehicles (U.S.A.) in the Air Corps, the Link Trainer; in the armored forces, the -ton [] command vehicle. Also referred to as "any small plane, helicopter, or gadget."

This definition is supported by the use of the term "jeep carrier" to refer to the Navy's small escort carriers.

Early in 1941, Willys-Overland demonstrated the vehicle's off-road capability by having it drive up the steps of the United States Capitol, driven by Willys test driver Irving "Red" Hausmann, who had recently heard soldiers at Fort Holabird calling it a "jeep." When asked by syndicated columnist Katharine Hillyer for the Washington Daily News (or by a bystander, according to another account) what it was called, Hausmann answered, "It's a jeep."

Katharine Hillyer's article was published nationally on February 19, 1941, and included a picture of the vehicle with the caption:

LAWMAKERS TAKE A RIDE- With Senator Meade, of New York, at the wheel, and Representative Thomas, of New Jersey, sitting beside him, one of the Army's new scout cars, known as "jeeps" or "quads", climbs up the Capitol steps in a demonstration yesterday. Soldiers in the rear seat for gunners were unperturbed.

Although the term was also military slang for vehicles that were untried or untested, this exposure caused all other jeep references to fade, leaving the 4x4 with the name.

Brand, trademarks and image

The "Jeep" brand has gone through many owners, starting with Willys-Overland, which filed the original trademark application for the "Jeep" brand-name in February 1943. To help establish the term as a Willys brand, the firm campaigned with advertisements emphasizing Willys' prominent contribution to the Jeep that helped win the war. Willys' application initially met with years of opposition, primarily from Bantam, but also from Minneapolis-Moline. The Federal Trade Commission initially ruled in favor of Bantam in May 1943, largely ignoring Minneapolis-Moline's claim, and continued to scold Willys-Overland after the war for its advertising. The FTC even slapped the company with a formal complaint, to cease and desist any claims that it "created or designed" the Jeep — Willys was only allowed to advertise its contribution to the Jeep's development.
Willys however proceeded to produce the first Civilian Jeep (CJ) branded vehicles in 1945, and simply copyrighted the Jeep name in 1946. Being the only company that continually produced "Jeep" vehicles after the war, Willys-Overland was eventually granted the name "Jeep" as a registered trademark in June 1950. Aside from Willys, King Features Syndicate has held a trademark on the name "Jeep" for their comics since August 1936.

Willys had also seriously considered the brand name AGRIJEEP, and was granted the trademark for it in December 1944, but instead the civilian production models as of 1945 were marketed as the "Universal Jeep," which reflected a wider range of uses outside of farming.

FCA US LLC, the most recent successor company to the Jeep brand, now holds trademark status on the name "Jeep" and the distinctive 7-slot front grille design. The original 9-slot grille associated with all World War II jeeps was designed by Ford for their GPW, and because it weighed less than the original "Slat Grille" of Willys (an arrangement of flat bars), was incorporated into the "standardized jeep" design.

The history of the HMMWV (Humvee) has ties with Jeep. In 1971, Jeep's Defense and Government Products Division was turned into AM General, a wholly-owned subsidiary of American Motors Corporation, which also owned Jeep. In 1979, while still owned by American Motors, AM General began the first steps toward designing the Humvee. AM General also continued manufacturing the two-wheel-drive DJ, which Jeep created in 1953. The General Motors Hummer and Chrysler Jeep have been waging battle in U.S. courts over the right to use seven slots in their respective radiator grilles. Chrysler Jeep claims it has the exclusive rights to use the seven vertical slits since it is the sole remaining assignee of the various companies since Willys gave their postwar jeeps seven slots instead of Ford's nine-slot design for the Jeep.

Off-road abilities

Jeep advertising has always emphasized the brand's vehicles' off-road capabilities. Today, the Wrangler is one of the few remaining four-wheel-drive vehicles with solid front and rear axles. These axles are known for their durability, strength, and articulation. New Wranglers come with a Dana 44 rear differential and a Dana 30 front differential. The upgraded Rubicon model of the JK Wrangler is equipped with electronically activated locking differentials, Dana 44 axles front and rear with 4.10 gears, a 4:1 transfer case, electronic sway bar disconnect, and heavy-duty suspension.

Another benefit of solid axle vehicles is they tend to be easier and cheaper to "lift" with aftermarket suspension systems. This increases the distance between the axle and chassis of the vehicle. By increasing this distance, larger tires can be installed, which will increase the ground clearance, allowing it to traverse even larger and more difficult obstacles. In addition to higher ground clearance, many owners aim to increase suspension articulation or "flex" to give their Jeeps greatly improved off-road capabilities. Good suspension articulation keeps all four wheels in contact with the ground and maintains traction.

Useful features of the smaller Jeeps are their short wheelbases, narrow frames, ample approach, breakover, and departure angles, thus enabling them to traverse through places where full-size four-wheel drives have difficulty.

Company history and ownership
After the war, Willys did not resume production of its passenger-car models, choosing instead to concentrate on Jeeps and Jeep-branded vehicles, launching the Jeep Station Wagon in 1946, the Jeep Truck in 1947, and the Jeepster in 1948. An attempt to re-enter the passenger-car market in 1952 with the Willys Aero sedan proved unsuccessful, and ended with the company's acquisition by Kaiser Motors in 1953, for $60 million. Kaiser initially called the merged company "Willys Motors", but renamed itself Kaiser-Jeep in 1963. By the end of 1955, Kaiser-Frazer had dropped the Willys Aero, as well as its own passenger cars to sell Jeeps exclusively.

American Motors Corporation (AMC) in turn purchased Kaiser's money-losing Jeep operations in 1970. This time $70 million changed hands. The utility vehicles complemented AMC's passenger car business by sharing components, achieving volume efficiencies, as well as capitalizing on Jeep's international and government markets. In 1971, AMC spun off Jeep's commercial, postal, and military vehicle lines into a separate subsidiary, AM General – the company that later developed the M998 Humvee. In 1976 Jeep introduced the CJ-7, replacing the CJ-6 in North America, as well as crossing 100,000 civilian units in annual global sales for the first time.

The French automaker Renault began investing in AMC in 1979. Renault began selling Jeeps through their European dealerships soon thereafter, beginning in Belgium and France, gradually supplanting a number of independent importers. During this period Jeep introduced the XJ Cherokee, its first unibody SUV; and global sales topped 200,000 for the first time in 1985. However, the replacement of the CJ Jeeps by the new Wrangler line in 1986 marked the start of a different era. By 1987, the automobile markets had changed and Renault itself was experiencing financial troubles.

At the same time, Chrysler Corporation wanted to capture the Jeep brand, as well as other assets of AMC. So Chrysler bought out AMC in 1987, shortly after the Jeep CJ-7 had been replaced with the AMC-designed Wrangler YJ. After more than 40 years, the four-wheel drive utility vehicles brand that had been a profitable niche for smaller automakers fell into the hands of one of the Big Three; and Jeep was the only AMC brand continued by Chrysler after the acquisition. But Chrysler subsequently merged with Daimler-Benz in 1998 and folded into DaimlerChrysler. DaimlerChrysler eventually sold most of its interest in Chrysler to a private equity company in 2007. Chrysler and the Jeep division operated under Chrysler Group LLC, until December 15, 2014, when Chrysler folded into Fiat Chrysler Automobiles, with the stateside subsidiary operating under 'FCA US LLC'.

Jeeps have been built under licence by various manufacturers around the world, including Mahindra in India, EBRO in Spain, and several in South America. Mitsubishi built more than 30 models in Japan between 1953 and 1998; Most were based on the CJ-3B model of the original Willys-Kaiser design.

Toledo, Ohio has been the headquarters of the Jeep brand since its inception, and the city has always been proud of this heritage. Although no longer produced in the same Toledo Complex as the World War II originals, two streets in the vicinity of the old plant are named Willys Parkway and Jeep Parkway. The Jeep Wrangler and Jeep Cherokee are built in the city currently, in separate facilities, not far from the site of the original Willys-Overland plant.

American Motors set up the first automobile-manufacturing joint venture in the People's Republic of China on January 15, 1984. The result was Beijing Jeep Corporation, Ltd., in partnership with Beijing Automobile Industry Corporation, to produce the Jeep Cherokee (XJ) in Beijing. Manufacture continued after Chrysler's buyout of AMC. This joint venture is now part of DaimlerChrysler and DaimlerChrysler China Invest Corporation. The original 1984 XJ model was updated and called the "Jeep 2500" toward the end of its production that ended after 2005.

In October 2022, the joint venture between Stellantis and Chinese company Guangzhou Automobile Group filed for bankruptcy, although Stellantis said it intends to continue servicing Jeep brand customers in China. 

While Jeeps have been built in India under license by Mahindra & Mahindra since the 1960s, Jeep has entered the Indian market directly in 2016, starting with the release of the Wrangler and Grand Cherokee in the country.

Ownership chronology
 1944–1953: Willys-Overland
 1953–1964: Kaiser Jeep (calling themselves "Willys Motors")
 1964–1970: Kaiser Jeep
 1970–1987: AMC (w/ Renault controlling production in 1986)
 1987–1998: Chrysler Corporation
 1998–2007: DaimlerChrysler AG
 2007–2009: Chrysler LLC
 2009–2013: Chrysler Group LLC - Fiat Group Automobiles
 2014–2021: Fiat Chrysler Automobiles
 2021–present: Stellantis

Military Jeeps model list

 1940 Willys Quad — Willys' first prototype, competing for the U.S. Army contract for a  reconnaissance vehicle
 1941 Willys MA — Willys' low-volume preproduction model, preceding the standardized World War II jeep
 1941–1944 Willys MT "Super Jeep" — 6x6,  prototype — a small number were built in various configurations 
 1942 Willys MB – slat grille
 1942–1945 Willys MB – stamped grille
 1943 Willys WAC (for 'Willys Air Cooled') "Jeeplet" — prototype for a super light-weight, full-time 4WD with front and rear independent suspension 
 1944 Willys MLW-1 (for 'Military Long Wheelbase') — prototype (never finished)
 1944 Willys MLW-2 (for 'Military Long Wheelbase') or "Jungle Jeep" — prototype for a half-ton, jungle-suited jeep 
 1948 Willys Jungle Burden Carrier — a medical litter, personnel and cargo carrier, built in small numbers for testing in jungle warfare and with airborne forces.
 1949–1952 Willys MC / M38
 1950 CJ V-35(/U) – deep water fording CJ-3A; 1000 units built for the USMC 
 1952–1971 Willys / Kaiser MD / M38A1
 1952–1957 Willys M38A1C – fitted with 105/106mm anti-tank recoilless rifle
 1950s/1960s Willys M38A1D – a small number of M38A1s carried the M28 or M29 "Davy Crockett Weapon System", the US' smallest tactical nuclear weapon, fired from a 120mm or 155mm recoilless rifle
 M170 Ambulance
 1953 Willys BC Bobcat aka "Aero Jeep" — prototype for a very small, lightweight jeep, for easier lifting by helicopters of the day.
 1959–1982 M151 jeep — Although the M151 was developed and initially produced by Ford, production contracts for the M151A2 were later also awarded to Kaiser Jeep and AM General Corp, a Jeep sister company, once Jeep had become part of AMC.
 1970–1982 M151A2
 M718A1 Ambulance
 M825 Weapons Platform
 1960–1968 Jeep M606
 1964 US Navy and USMC variants of the Forward Control FC-170, labeled "Truck, Diesel engine,  GVW, 4x4":
 M676 Truck, Cargo Pickup
 M677 Truck, Cargo Pickup w/4 Dr. Cab
 M678 Truck, Carry All
 M679 Truck, Ambulance
 1967–1969 Kaiser Jeep M715 truck — based on the civilian Jeep Gladiator

Civilian Jeeps model list

Jeep CJ

The CJ (for "Civilian Jeep") series were literally the first "Jeep" branded vehicles sold commercially to the civilian public, beginning in 1945 with the CJ-2A, followed by the CJ-3A in 1949 and the CJ-3B in 1953. These early Jeeps are frequently referred to as "flat-fenders" because their front fenders were completely flat and straight, just as on the original WW II model (the Willys MB and identical Ford GPW).

The CJ-4 exists only as a single 1951 prototype and constitutes the "missing link" between the flat-fendered CJ-2A and CJ-3A/B, and the subsequent Jeeps with new bodies, featuring rounded fenders and hoods, beginning with the 1955 CJ-5, first introduced as the military Willys MD (or M38A1). The restyled body was mostly prompted to clear the taller new overhead-valve Hurricane engine.
 1944–1945 CJ-2 – pre-production units
 1945–1949 CJ-2A
 1949–1953 CJ-3A
 1953–1968 CJ-3B
 1954–1983 CJ-5
 1955–1975 CJ-6
 1964–1967 CJ-5A/CJ-6A Tuxedo Park
 1976–1986 CJ-7
 1981–1985 CJ-8 Scrambler
 1981–1985 CJ-10

Willys Jeep Station Wagon and Truck
 The 1946–1965 Willys Jeep Station Wagon and the
 1947–1965 Willys Jeep Truck shared much in terms of styling and engineering.
With over 300,000 wagons and variants built in the U.S., it was one of Willys' most successful post-World War II models. Its production coincided with consumers moving to the suburbs.

Willys / Jeep Jeepster & (Jeepster) Commando

The Jeepster introduced in 1948 was directly based on the rear-wheel-drive Jeep Station Wagon chassis, and shared many of the same parts.
 1948–1950 Willys VJ Jeepster
 1948–1949 VJ2 Jeepster
 1949–1951 VJ3 Jeepster

(Jeepster) Commando
 1966–1971 C101—Jeepster Commando
 Hurst Jeepster (only 100 produced)
 Hurst Half Cab
 Revival Jeepster
 Commando convertible
 open body roadster
 1972–1973 C104—Jeep Commando
 Commando Half Cab

Jeep Forward Control

 The 1956–1965 Jeep Forward Control was built in both civilian and military models. The civilian versions were:
 FC-150
 FC-160—Spain, India
 FC-170

Jeep DJ and Fleetvan

From 1955 onwards Willys offered two-wheel drive versions of their CJ Jeeps for commercial use, called DJ models (for 'Dispatcher Jeep'), in both open and closed body styles. A well-known version was the right-hand drive model with sliding side-doors, used by the US Postal service.
In 1961 the range was expanded with the 'Fleetvan' delivery van, based on DJ Jeeps.
 1955 USAF DJ
 1955–1964 DJ-3A
 1965–1975 DJ-5
 1965–1973 DJ-6
 1967–1975 DJ-5A
 1970–1972 DJ-5B
 1973–1974 DJ-5C
 1975–1976 DJ-5D
 1976 DJ-5E Electruck
 1977–1978 DJ-5F
 1979 DJ-5G
 1982 DJ-5L

Fleetvan Jeep
 1961–1975 Fleetvan
 FJ-3
 FJ-3A
 FJ-6
 FJ-6A
 FJ-8
 FJ-9

SJ Wagoneer, Cherokee and pickups

SUV models (1962–1991)
 1962–1983 SJ Wagoneer
 1966–1969 SJ Super Wagoneer
 1974–1983 SJ Cherokee
 1984–1991 SJ Grand Wagoneer
Pickup models (1962–1988)
 1962–1971 Jeep Gladiator (SJ)
 1971–1988 Jeep pickup truck (J-)

Jeep Cherokee (XJ) and Comanche

 1984–2001 XJ Cherokee
 1984–1990 XJ Wagoneer
 1984–1985 Broughwood
 1984–1990 Limited
 1986–1992 Jeep Comanche (MJ)

Jeep Wrangler

 1987–1995 Jeep Wrangler YJ
 1991–1993 Renegade
 1988–1995 Wrangler Long—Venezuela
 1995 Wrangler Rio Grande
 1997–2006 Wrangler TJ
 2002 TJ Se, X, Sport, Sahara models
 2003 TJ Rubicon, Rubicon Tomb Raider Edition, Sahara, Sport, X, Se models, Freedom Edition
 2004–2006 TJ Long Wheel Base (LJ) Unlimited ( longer than a standard TJ) Rubicon, Sport, X, Se models
 2004–2005 Willys Edition (2004–1997 made, 2005–2001 made)
 2004 Columbia Edition
 2005 Rubicon Sahara Unlimited TJ LWB (LJ) (1000 made)
 2006 Golden Eagle Edition, 65 Year Anniversary Edition (1,675 Black 65th Anniversary Editions made)
 2007–2011 TJL AEV Brute: Compact pickup truck, 2-door version; produced by AEV with the Jeep logo.
 2007–2018 Wrangler JK
 2007–2009 JK Rubicon, Sahara, X
 2010 JK Rubicon, Sahara, Mountain, Islander, and Sport Editions
 2011 70th Anniversary, Call of Duty: Black Ops, Mojave, and Oscar Mike Military (200 made) Editions
 2011 JK-8 Independence — a MOPAR JK pick-up conversion kit, mirroring the 1980s CJ-8 Scrambler pick-up
 2013 Rubicon 10th Anniversary Edition
 2013–2017 Brute Double Cab: Pickup truck, 4-door version, produced by American Expedition Vehicles
 2014 Willys Wheeler Edition
 2017 — Jeep Wrangler JL
 2019 — Jeep Gladiator JT

Grand Cherokee

 1993–1998 Grand Cherokee ZJ
 1993–1995 Base SE
 1993–1998 Laredo
 1993–1998 Limited
 1995–1997 Orvis "Limited Edition"
 1997–1998 TSi
 1998 5.9 Limited
 1993 ZJ Jeep Grand Wagoneer
 1999–2004 Grand Cherokee WJ Grand Cherokee
 2002–2003 Sport
 2002–2004 Special edition
 2002–2004 Overland
 2004 Columbia Edition
 2005–2010 Grand Cherokee WK: Five-passenger family-oriented SUV — "WK" is the designator for the 2005–2010 Grand Cherokee, marks the beginning of the -K designation compared to the -J designation
 2011–2022 Jeep Grand Cherokee WK2
 2021- Present Jeep Grand Cherokee WL

Jeep Liberty / Cherokee

 2002–2007 Jeep Liberty KJ or Jeep Cherokee (KJ) outside North America
 Sport
 Limited
 Renegade
 2003 Freedom Edition
 2004–05 Rocky Mountain Edition
 2004 Columbia Edition
 2006 65th Anniversary Edition
 2007 Latitude Edition (replaced Renegade)
 2008–2012 Jeep Liberty KK or Jeep Cherokee (KK) outside North America

Jeep Commander
 2006–2010 Jeep Commander (XK)
 2006 Base
 2007–2010 Sport
 2006–2010 Limited
 2007–2009 Overland

Jeep Compass and Patriot platform

 2007–2017 Jeep Compass MK49
 2017–present Jeep Compass MP/552
 2006–2017 Jeep Patriot (MK74): Compact sport utility vehicle

Concepts and prototypes

 1944 CJ-1 prototype
 1949 Alcoa Aluminum-bodied Jeepster Coupe (prototype)
 1949–1950 X-98 prototype; with flat fenders, but a rounded hood and grille like the CJ-5, it may have been the first F-head-powered Jeep
 1950 CJ-4 prototype
 1950 CJ-4M prototype
 1950 CJ-4MA prototype
 1952 CJ Coiler: experimental design for an all independent suspension, with portal-hub swing-axles and coil-springs
 1958 DJ-3A Pickup: Prototype pickup truck version of the DJ-3A
 1958 Jeep Creep: prototype utility vehicle; several versions built for tests, including a Postal rig and an aircraft tug
 1959 Jeep J-100 Malibu and Berkeley: Later developed into the Wagoneer
 1960 Jeep Wide-Trac: Concept for developing a low-cost vehicle for third-world countries
 1962 The Brazilian Jeepster (prototype)
 1963 Jeep XM-200: J200-based concept for developing a low-cost vehicle for third-world countries
 1965 Jeep/Renault Model H: A light 4x4 prototype based on the Renault 16
 1966 FWD Concept Jeepvair: Similar to the Model H but with a Chevrolet Corvair powertrain
 1970 XJ001
 1970 XJ002
 1971 Jeep Cowboy: A design study using AMC's "compact" automobile platform
 1977 Jeep II
 1979 Jeep Jeepster II
 1986 Cherokee Targa: A two-door Cherokee convertible (later revised as Jeep Freedom show car)
 1987 Comanche Thunderchief: This vehicle was put into production later as the Comanche Eliminator
 1989 Jeep Concept 1: Evolved into the ZJ Grand Cherokee
 1989 Jeep Rubicon Wrangler: This vehicle was later put in production
 1990 Jeep JJ: Essentially what would later be called the Icon
 1990 Jeep Freedom: A revised Cherokee Targa
 1991 Jeep Wagoneer 2000: A large design concept
 1993 Jeep Ecco
 1997 Jeep Cherokee Casablanca: A special edition of Cherokee, never produced
 1997 Jeep Wrangler Ultimate Res: A tuned version of a regular TJ Wrangler developed for SEMA show
 1997 Fender Jeep Wrangler
 1997 Jeep Dakar: A fused version of a XJ Cherokee and TJ Wrangler
 1997 Jeep Icon: A design study for the next-generation Wrangler
 1999 Jeep Commander: methanol fuel cell drive train with electric motors
 1999 Jeep Journey
 1999 Jeep Jeepster Concept
 2000 Jeep Cherokee Total Exposure
 2000 Jeep Varsity: Subsequently, put into production as the Compass
 2000 Jeep Commander Concept: Subsequently, put into production as the XK
 2000 Jeep Willys
 2001 Jeep Willys2
 2002 Jeep Wrangler Tabasco
 2002 Jeep Wrangler Patriot: A special decal package for the Wrangler X/Sport
 2002 Jeep Wrangler Mountain Biker
 2004 Jeep Grand Cherokee (WJ) Concierge
 2004 Jeep Treo
 2004 Jeep Res 
 2004 Jeep Liberator CRD
 2005 Jeep Hurricane: The 4-wheel steering system allows the vehicle to have both a zero turning circle, and "crab" sideways. Its engine was later put in the Grand Cherokee (WK) SRT-8
 2005 Jeep Gladiator Concept
 2005 Jeep Aggressor (the Rezo)
 2007 Jeep Trailhawk
 2008 Jeep Renegade
 2010 Jeep J8
 2010 Jeep Nukizer: Design study inspired by the Military Kaiser M-715
 2011 Jeep Wrangler Pork Chop
 2011 Jeep Compass Canyon: uses a  lift
 2011 Jeep Cherokee Overland
 2012 Jeep Mighty FC: inspired by the 1956 to 1965 Forward Control vehicles Jeep sold
 2012 Jeep J-12 Concept: recalling the 1962–1971 Gladiator pickups
 2013 Jeep Wrangler Mopar Recon
 2013 Jeep Grand Cherokee Trailhawk EcoDiesel
 2013 Jeep Wrangler Stitch
 2013 Jeep Wrangler Flattop: featuring a one-piece, windowless hardtop
 2014 Jeep Wrangler Level Red
 2014 Jeep Cherokee Dakar
 2014 Jeep Wrangler MOJO
 2015 Jeep Chief
 2015 Jeep Wrangler Africa
 2015 Jeep Wrangler Red Rock Responder
 2015 Jeep Staff Car: a tribute to Jeep's military history starting with WWII

Current models
The Jeep brand currently produces five models, but 8 vehicles are under the brand name or use the Jeep logo:
Jeep Renegade: Subcompact Sport Utility Vehicle
Jeep Wrangler
JK: Standard wheelbase Compact Sport utility vehicle, 2-door version
JK Unlimited: Long wheelbase Mid-Size sport utility vehicle, 4-door version
J8: Mid-Size military utility vehicle; Produced by AIL, AAV, and AEV.
TJL: Compact pickup truck, 2-door version; Produced by AAV.
JL: Short (2-door) and long (4-door) wheelbase SUV; in production since November 2017
Jeep Gladiator (JT): mid-size pickup truck, went on sale in early 2019 as a 2020 model.
Jeep Grand Cherokee: Mid-size sport utility vehicle
Jeep Compass: Compact sport utility vehicle
Jeep Cherokee KL: Mid-size sport utility vehicle
Jeep Commander: Mid-size sport utility vehicle, mainly for emerging markets 
Jeep Wagoneer/Jeep Grand Wagoneer (WS): Full-Size SUVs
 Jeep Avenger

Jeeps built outside the USA

Jeeps have been built and/or assembled around the world by various companies.
 Argentina – IKA Jeeps 1956–current; now owned by Chrysler
 Australia – Willys Motors Australia – 1940s–1980s
 Brazil – Willys Overland do Brasil, purchased by Ford to become Ford do Brasil – 1957–1985 built the Jeep Rural from 1960 to 1977, and the Troller T4 is a fiberglass bodied Jeep version built in Brazil. Troller was purchased by Ford do Brasil in 2007.
 Burma/Myanmar – Two Burmese companies produce unlicensed copies of jeeps; Myanmar Jeeps and Chin Dwin Star Jeeps.
 Canada – Kaiser Jeep – 1959–1969
 China – Beijing Jeep Corporation – 1983 to 2009 as Beijing-Benz DaimlerChrysler Automotive. Since the 2014 sale of Chrysler and Jeep to FIAT jeeplike and other similar vehicles are now produced by BAIC subsidiary Beijing Automobile Works Co., Ltd. (BAW). Fiat-Chrysler plans to re-open Jeep production in China through a joint venture with Guangzhou Automobile Industry Group (GAIG).
 Colombia – Willys Colombia – at least until 1999
 Egypt – Arab Organization for Industrialization subsidiary Arab American Vehicles based in Cairo produces the Jeep Cherokee; the open-top, Wrangler-based Jeep AAV TJL.
 France – Licence produced jeeps: Hotchkiss M201 and by Cournil (now Auverland) – 1952–1962
 India – Mahindra & Mahindra Limited – 1960s-current
 Iran – Pars Khodro, ShahBaaz, Sahra, and Ahoo – ShahBaaz based on DJ series, Sahra based on Jeep Wrangler and CJ series, and Ahoo based on Wagoneer
 Israel – Automotive Industries which produces the AIL Storm (Sufa) series of Jeep Wrangler-derivatives
 Italy – 1950s
 Japan – Mitsubishi Jeeps – 1953–1998
 Korea – Asia Motors, Ltd, Dong A Motors (SsangYong Motor Company), Keowha, and Kia. (None use Jeep name) – 1980s-current
 Mexico – VAM Jeeps – 1946–1987
 Netherlands – Nekaf Jeep, NEKAF and Kemper & Van Twist – 1954–1962
 Philippines – Jeepneys; MD Juan Willys MB; "E-jeepneys" or minibuses, LSV (low-speed vehicles) which uses electricity.

 Portugal – Bravia Sarl – 1960s to 1980s This Lisbon company assembled a number of Kaiser Jeep M-201 models from several Spanish EBRO and VIASA parts built to order for the USAF airfields & the US Army based at the time in Portugal, of the 500 vehicles made, most had American running gear.
 Russia - Russian company APAL produces the Jeeplike Stalker which utilizes a space frame covered with plastic panels, using Lada Niva chassis and mechanicals.
 Spain – Vehículos Industriales y Agrícolas, S.A (VIASA), absorbed by Ebro trucks, and later sold to Nissan – 1960-1990s For instance built a long-wheelbase version of the CJ-3B from 1955 to 1968.
 Turkey – Tuzla – 1954-1970s
 Venezuela – Valencia Carabobo 1962–2011, 1962 Tejerias Edo Aragua Willys de Venezuela, S.A, 1979–2011 Ensambladora Carabobo C.A Valencia Edo Carabobo

Jeep apparel and sponsorships
Jeep is also a brand of apparel of outdoor lifestyle sold under license. It is reported that there are between 600 and 1,500 such outlets in China, vastly outnumbering the number of Jeep auto dealers in the country.

In April 2012 Jeep signed a shirt sponsorship deal worth €35m ($45m) with Italian football club Juventus.

In August 2014, Jeep signed a sponsorship deal with the Greek football club AEK Athens F.C.

Jeep has been the title sponsor of France's top men's professional basketball league, LNB Pro A, since 2018. Under the deal, the league markets itself as Jeep Élite.

Sponsorships
 Dewa United
 Juventus
 Al-Nasr
 Balestier Khalsa

See also

Notes

References
Inline

General

External links

 
 "Leeping Lena Joins the Army", October 1941 first detailed article on what became known as the Jeep
 Autobiography of a Jeep (1943). United Films, Prelinger Archives, Historical Public Domain video.
 
 Meet the Postwar Jeep  August 1945 Popular Science
 Story of the Jeep and the American Story are Intertwined A Visual History

 
Off-road vehicles
American Motors
Stellantis
Car manufacturers of the United States
Defense companies of the United States
Motor vehicle manufacturers based in Michigan
Motor vehicle manufacturers based in Ohio
Vehicle manufacturing companies established in 1945
Companies based in Toledo, Ohio
Auburn Hills, Michigan
Car brands
American companies established in 1945